Bum Phillips is an opera in two acts by American composer Peter Stopschinski. Kirk Lynn wrote the English language libretto based on Bum Phillips' memoirs Bum Phillips: Coach, Cowboy, Christian. The opera was conceived by theater director Luke Leonard and commissioned by Monk Parrots, Inc. as described in a 2014 Sports on Earth article titled "A Night at the Bum Phillips Opera".

Performance history

February 2013 – Workshop performance of act 1 produced by Post Theatre Company at Long Island University-Post and La MaMa Experimental Theatre Club.
March 15–30, 2014 – World premiere in the Ellen Stewart Theatre at La MaMa Experimental Theatre Club in New York. The performance was attended by former NFL players and Houston Oilers, Dan Pastorini and Lawrence Harris, and Bum Phillips' son and NFL coach, Wade Phillips. It was conducted by Peter Stopschinski, performed by American Modern Ensemble, and directed and designed by Luke Leonard. Dan Pastorini reacted, "Bum Phillips and opera don't belong in the same sentence ... And I sat there and I watched this thing unfold for two hours, and at the end of it I had tears coming down my cheeks," and Wade Phillips responded, "It certainly meant a lot to us. Meant a lot to me ... Not many people get a tribute to them in any way and this opera did it for us."
September 24, 2015 – Benefit performance produced by Dan Pastorini Charity at the Stafford Centre in Stafford, Texas. The performance was introduced by Dan Pastorini and attended by NFL players Earl Campbell, Billy Johnson, Ken Burrough, Robert Brazile, and others.

Roles

Instrumentation
The work is scored for one violin, one bass, two French horns, one drummer, percussion, and two pianos (one Fender Rhodes).

References

External links
 
 NFL Films Presents, Show: #7
 HowlRound on YouTube: Bum Phillips All-American Opera World Premiere

2014 operas
Operas
Operas set in the 20th century
English-language operas
Cultural depictions of American men
Cultural depictions of players of American football
Operas based on real people